Mark Knowles and Daniel Nestor were the defending champions but lost in the second round to Joshua Eagle and Andrew Florent.

Jim Grabb and Richey Reneberg won in the final 7–6, 4–6, 6–4 against Petr Korda and Cyril Suk.

Seeds
The top four seeded teams received byes into the second round.

Draw

Final

Top half

Bottom half

References
 1996 RCA Championships Doubles Draw

1996,Doubles
RCA Championships,Singles